Sunshine Superman: 18 Songs of Love and Freedom is a compilation album from Scottish singer-songwriter Donovan. It was released in the United Kingdom in September 1993 (Remember RMB 75059) and the United States on 21 May 1996.

History
By the early 1990s, Donovan's 1965 Pye Records recordings had been reissued many times.  Instead of simply reissuing the same recordings, Remember Records assembled a compilation with eleven of the 1965 recordings and seven songs from Donovan's 1984 album Lady of the Stars.  The Lady of the Stars recordings included re-recordings of "Sunshine Superman" and "Season of the Witch".  The album cover of Sunshine Superman: 18 Songs of Love and Freedom did not indicate any difference between the original recordings and the Lady of the Stars versions included.

Track listing
All tracks by Donovan Leitch, except where noted.

"Catch the Wind" – 3:01
"Colours" – 2:49
"Sunshine Superman" – 4:04
"Turquoise" – 3:39
"Oh Deed I Do" (Bert Jansch) – 2:16
"Belated Forgiveness Plea" – 2:59
"Remember the Alamo" (Jane Bowers) – 3:12
"The War Drags On" (Mick Softley) – 3:42
"Ramblin' Boy" – 2:35
"To Try for the Sun" – 3:46
"The Ballad of a Crystal Man" – 3:18
"Hey Gyp (Dig the Slowness)" – 3:10
"Lady of the Stars" – 4:42
"Season of the Witch" – 5:22
"Living for the Love Light" – 3:44
"Every Reason" – 3:03
"Boy for Every Girl" – 4:38
"Till I See You Again" – 3:18

External links
 Sunshine Superman: 18 Songs Of Love And Freedom – Donovan Unofficial Site

1993 compilation albums
Donovan compilation albums